There are at least 98 named mountains in Missoula County, Montana.
 Albert Point, el. 
 Baldy, el. 
 Baldy Mountain, el. 
 Bata Mountain, el. 
 Beavertail Hill, el. 
 Belmont Point, el. 
 Black Mountain, el. 
 Black Mountain, el. 
 Blacktail Peak, el. 
 Blue Mountain, el. 
 Blue Point, el. 
 Boles Point, el. 
 Bonner Mountain, el. 
 Boulder Point, el. 
 Boyd Mountain, el. 
 Burnt Fork Pinnacle, el. 
 Carmine Peak, el. 
 Cayuse Hill, el. 
 Charity Peak, el. 
 Ch-paa-qn Peak, el. 
 Cooney Mountain, el. 
 Council Hill, el. 
 Daughter of the Sun Mountain, el. 
 Davis Point, el. 
 Diamond Mountain, el. 
 Diamond Point, el. 
 Edith Peak, el. 
 Elk Creek Point, el. 
 Elk Mountain, el. 
 Ellis Mountain, el. 
 Fawn Peak, el. 
 Fisher Peak, el. 
 Ginny Mountain, el. 
 Goat Mountain, el. 
 Gold Creek Peak, el. 
 Gyp Mountain, el. 
 Hemlock Point, el. 
 Holland Peak, el. 
 Horsehead Peak, el. 
 Iris Point, el. 
 Lindy Peak, el. 
 Little Belmont Point, el. 
 Little Carmine Peak, el. 
 Lockwood Point, el. 
 Lolo Peak, el. 
 Lost Mountain, el. 
 Martin Point, el. 
 McCauley Butte, el. 
 McLeod Peak, el. 
 Miller Peak, el. 
 Mineral Peak, el. 
 Mitten Mountain, el. 
 Mormon Peak, el. 
 Morrison Peak, el. 
 Mosquito Peak, el. 
 Mount Dean Stone, el. 
 Mount Henry, el. 
 Mount Jumbo, el. 
 Mount Sentinel, el. 
 Mount Shoemaker, el. 
 Murphy Peak, el. 
 North Jocko Peak, el. 
 Olson Peak, el. 
 Petty Mountain, el. 
 Pilot Knob, el. 
 Point Saint Charles, el. 
 Point Six, el. 
 Ptarmigan Mountain, el. 
 Red Butte, el. 
 Richmond Peak, el. 
 Rocky Peak, el. 
 Rocky Point, el. 
 Sheep Mountain, el. 
 Skookum Butte, el. 
 Stuart Peak, el. 
 Sugarloaf Mountain, el. 
 Sunday Mountain, el. 
 Sunflower Mountain, el. 
 Sunset Crags, el. 
 Sunset Hill, el. 
 Sunset Peak, el. 
 Sunset Peak, el. 
 Tango Point, el. 
 Telephone Butte, el. 
 Three Summit Peak, el. 
 Triangle Peak, el. 
 TV Mountain, el. 
 University Mountain, el. 
 Wagon Mountain, el. 
 Waldbillig Mountain, el. 
 Waterworks Hill, el. 
 Weather Peak, el. 
 West Fork Butte, el. 
 West Fork Point, el. 
 Wild Horse Point, el. 
 Wishard Peak, el. 
 Wolverine Peak, el. 
 Woody Mountain, el.

See also
 List of mountains in Montana
 List of mountain ranges in Montana

Notes

Missoula